Brämhult is a locality in Borås Municipality, Västra Götaland, Sweden.

Brämhult was originally an agrarian village formed around a medieval wooden church, the oldest parts of which have been dated to the mid-15th century.

Today, Brämhult is a suburb of Borås.

Sports
The following sports clubs are located in Brämhult:

 Brämhults IK

References

Populated places in Västra Götaland County